was an Imperial Japanese Army facility  called the Kwantung Army Warhorse Disease Prevention Shop that focused on the development of biological weapons during World War II. It was operated by the Kempeitai, the Japanese military police. Its headquarters was located in Mokotan, Manchukuo, a village just south of the city of Changchun. It had branches in Dairen and Hailar. The Hailar branch was later transferred to Foshan. Between 600 and 800 people worked at Unit 100.

Organization 
Unit 100 had six sections.
 Bacteriological section
 Pathological section
 Animal Experimentation
 Organic chemistry
 Botanical, and plant pathology. Poisoning, or infecting, plants with the help of bacteria.
 Preparations for bacteriological warfare

Mission

The main purpose of Unit 100 was to conduct research about diseases originating from animals. As most armies were still heavily dependent on horses, the Imperial Japanese Army hoped to find ways to kill them and therefore to weaken military power. Furthermore, they hoped to spread disease via animal carriers. To this end, former members claim that experiments were also conducted with human beings. In practice, Unit 731 was the group tasked with developing biological weapons against humans. Although smaller than Unit 731, Unit 100 was still a large organization. Its annual bacteria production capacity was projected to reach 1,000 kg of anthrax, 500 kg of glanders, and 100 kg of red rust (fungus). The goal was never reached, due to equipment shortages.

Senior Sgt. Kazuo Mitomo described some of Unit 100's human experiments:
"I put as much as a gram of heroin into some porridge and gave this porridge to an arrested Chinese citizen who ate it; about 20 minutes later he lost consciousness and remained in that state until he died 15-16 hours later. We knew that such a dose of heroin is fatal, but it did not make any difference to us whether he died or lived. On some of the prisoners I experimented 5-6 times, testing the action of Korean bindweed, bactal and castor oil seeds. One of the prisoners of Russian nationality became so exhausted from the experiments that no more could be performed on him, and Matsui ordered me to kill that Russian by giving him an injection of potassium cyanide. After the injection, the man died at once. Bodies were buried in the unit's cattle cemetery."

Unit chief Yujiro Wakamatsu ordered Hirazakura to purchase hundreds of cattle and put them to pasture along the Siberian  border north-east of Hailar, ready to be infected by airborne dispersion. It was hoped that in the event of a Soviet invasion these infected livestock would mingle with local herds to cause epidemics and to destroy food supplies.

Unit 100 staff poisoned and drugged Russians, Chinese and Koreans with heroin, castor oil, tobacco and other substances for weeks at a time. Some died during the experimentation. When survivors were determined to no longer be useful for experimentation and were complaining of illness, staff told them they would receive a shot of medicine, but instead executed them with potassium cyanide injections. Executions were also carried out by gunshots.

Capabilities 
Unit 100 could produce 1,000 kilograms of anthrax germs, 500 kilograms of glanders germs, and 100 kilograms of redrust germs in a single year.

Members 
 Otozō Yamada, Direct controller, 1944-1945
 Lieutenant General Takahashi, Chief of the Veterinary Administration of the Kwantung Army
 Hirazakura Zensaku, officer of the 1st and 2nd division from July 1942 to December 1943. Was in the 6th division from December 1943 until April 1944. He was then at Unit 543 until the end of the war.
 Fukuzumi Mitsuyoshi, doctor
 Sakurashita Kiyoshi, civilian employee
 Hataki Akira, civilian employee
 Wakamatsu, Major General of the Veterinary Service

Biological warfare agents
The following potential agents were tested:
Yersinia pestis, which causes plague
Burkholderia mallei, which causes Glanders in horses: Kuwabara gave testimony after World War II that Unit 100 released horses infected with Glanders.
Bacillus anthracis, which causes anthrax

See also 
 Japanese war crimes
 Unit 731
 Second Sino-Japanese War
 Kwantung Army

References

External links 
 The Other Holocaust.
 Alliance for Preserving the Truth of Sino-Japanese War

Biological warfare facilities
Japanese human subject research
Second Sino-Japanese War crimes
Japanese biological weapons program
Japanese war crimes